Ruby Ruby Love is a South Korean web series produced for fashion and lifestyle pay TV channel OnStyle, starring Seohyun, Lee Chul-woo and Lee Yi-kyung. The first two episodes of the web drama were released on Naver TV Cast on January 18, 2017, and the final episode on January 26, 2017. It was later broadcast on OnStyle as a drama special on January 27, 2017.

Plot 
The story follows Ruby Lee (이루비) (portrayed by Seohyun), a genius young woman who suffers from sociophobia but comes across a magic ring that helps her become a successful jewelry designer.

Cast 
 Seohyun as Lee Ruby
 Lee Chul-woo as Won Suk, Ruby’s one and only friend
 Lee Yi-kyung as Na Ji-suk, CEO of a jewelry enterprise
 Ji Hye-ran as Yoo Bi-joo
 Hwang Seok-jeong as Dan Ho-bak

References

International broadcast

External links 
 
 Ruby Ruby Love on Daum

2017 web series debuts
2017 web series endings
South Korean drama web series
Naver TV original programming